The modern constellation Serpens lies across one of the quadrants, symbolized by the Azure Dragon of the East, and Three Enclosures, that divide the sky in traditional Chinese uranography.

Stars
The map of Chinese constellation in constellation Serpens area consists of :

See also
Traditional Chinese star names
Chinese constellations

References

External links
Serpens – Chinese associations
 中國星區、星官及星名英譯表
 天象文學
 台灣自然科學博物館天文教育資訊網
 中國古天文
 中國古代的星象系統

Astronomy in China
Serpens (constellation)